Tomasz Konicz (born 1973 in Olsztyn, Poland) is an author and journalist.

Work 
Konicz studied history and philosophy in Hanover, as well as economic history in Posen. As a journalist, he regularly writes for, among other publications, Telepolis, Neues deutschland, konkret, Exit!, Streifzüge, and Hintergrund. Konicz was also editor-in-chief of the journal Telepolis. Konicz covers political economy, crises, and conspiratorial thinking. Konicz writes in the tradition of Wertkritik and the World-systems theory.

Publications 

 Politik in der Krisenfalle (Telepolis): Kapitalismus am Scheideweg, 2012, Heise, .
 Krisenideologie – Wahn und Wirklichkeit spätkapitalistischer Krisenverarbeitung, 2013, Heise, .
 Aufstieg und Zerfall des Deutschen Europa, 2015, .
 Kapitalkollaps – Die finale Krise der Weltwirtschaft, 2. Auflage 2016, .
 Faschismus im 21. Jahrhundert. Skizzen der drohenden Barbarei.  Heise Medien, 2018. .
 Klimakiller Kapital. Wie ein Wirtschaftssystem unsere Lebensgrundlagen zerstört. Mandelbaum Verlag, Wien 2020, .

External links 

 
 Website Konicz.info
 Articles by Tomasz Konicz
 Interview bei ANF with a picture of Tomasz Konicz

References 

German journalists
1973 births
Living people